A gofer, go-fer or gopher  is an employee who specializes in the delivery of special items to their superior(s). Examples of these special items include a cup of coffee, a tool, a tailored suit, or a car. Outside of the business world, the term is used to describe a child or young adult who is learning how to do tasks and is sent to fetch items. A similar job is that of peon in Commonwealth countries.

Etymology
Gofer is a linguistic simplification of the two words 'go' and 'for'. Simplified, in English, it means 'go for this' or 'go for that' and reflects the likelihood of instructions to go for coffee, dry cleaning, or stamps, or to make other straightforward, familiar or unfamiliar procurements. The term gofer originated in North America.

Career opportunities
Likewise, gofer may refer to a junior member of an organisation who generally receive the most vexing and thankless work. Law firms with a top-heavy management structure, having not enough junior lawyers to take care of menial yet necessary tasks, can be referred to as having "too many loafers and not enough gophers".

In popular culture

In the 1953 movie She's Back on Broadway, at about the 11 minute mark, the word is used backstage at a Broadway show, with a clear explanation.

In the first season (1976) of the television series The Muppet Show, Scooter was given the stage manager job because his uncle owned the theater where the Muppets performed. The pun was that a gopher not only is an animal, like the Muppets supposedly are, but is a fast animal, collecting food and delivering it somewhere else. At some point in the Muppets series, Kermit the Frog suggested that he himself was a gofer, but probably didn't last long in the job.

In the fourth season of Boy Meets World, Corey gets a job as a gofer for two shady businessmen (Buddy Hackett and Soupy Sales).

Another example of a gofer is the fictional character of Salvatore "Turtle" Assante (Jerry Ferrara) on the comedy-drama HBO television series Entourage.

Chavo Guerrero was considered to be a gofer for his aunt Vickie Guerrero on WWE's SmackDown for most of 2008 (Vickie was SmackDown's General Manager at the time) when they were both part of the villainous La Familia stable. This would become a sporadic running joke on WWE programming as other superstars would mock Chavo for this reason. 

In the 2011 film My Week with Marilyn, the protagonist, Colink Clark, is the third assistant director but describes himself as "a gofer, really. Go for this, go for that."

In the Taxi episode "Alex the Gofer", Alex takes a part-time job as an assistant to Broadway producers.

The term gofer is used in the anime Zombie-Loan.

Brad Pitt's character Cliff Booth is a gofer for Rick Dalton (Leonardo DiCaprio) in the 2019 movie Once Upon a Time in Hollywood.

References

Employment classifications
Office work